Pekka Arbelius (born 26 June 1960 in Oulu) is a Finnish retired ice hockey player.

Arbelius played for Kärpät, MODO Hockey and JYP.  He represented Finland in five World Championships (1981, 1982, 1985, 1986 and 1990), and he also took the 1979-1980 Jarmo Wasama memorial trophy.

External links
 

1960 births
Finnish ice hockey forwards
JYP Jyväskylä players
Oulun Kärpät players
Modo Hockey players
Living people
Sportspeople from Oulu